is a retired Japanese volleyball player. He played as a setter and was one of the key players in the Japan men's national volleyball team in the 2000s. Usami was named Most Spectacular Player at the 2003 FIVB World Cup, where Japan ended in ninth place.

Honours
2001 FIVB World League — 9th place
2002 World Championship — 9th place
2003 FIVB World League — 13th place
2003 FIVB World Cup — 9th place
2004 FIVB World League — 10th place
2007 FIVB World Cup — 9th place

Individual awards
 2003 FIVB Men's World Cup#Awards — Most Spectacular Player

References

Sources
 FIVB biography

1979 births
Living people
Japanese men's volleyball players
People from Yokote, Akita
Sportspeople from Akita Prefecture
Olympic volleyball players of Japan
Volleyball players at the 2008 Summer Olympics
Asian Games medalists in volleyball
Volleyball players at the 2002 Asian Games
Volleyball players at the 2010 Asian Games
Medalists at the 2002 Asian Games
Medalists at the 2010 Asian Games
Asian Games gold medalists for Japan
Asian Games bronze medalists for Japan
21st-century Japanese people